In the game of chess, interference occurs when the line between an attacked piece and its defender is interrupted by sacrificially interposing a piece. It is a chess tactic which seldom arises, and is therefore often overlooked. Opportunities for interference are rare because the defended object must be more valuable than the sacrificed piece, and the interposition must itself present a threat. Huczek defines interference as a tactic involving blocking moves that obstruct lines of attack. This definition may be  expanded by including blocking moves that disrupt lines of defense.

Examples

In diagram A, White to play will apparently be obliged to retreat the knight from f5, because the squares to which it could advance are all guarded. The interference move 1.Nd6+, however, interrupts the black rook's defense of the black queen. If Black plays either 1...cxd6 or 1...Bxd6, White will capture Black's queen. Therefore, Black has no better play than 1...Rxd6 2.exd6 Qxe2 3.Rxe2 Bxd6, conceding the exchange for a pawn.

A more subtle example of interference occurs when the interposing piece interrupts two lines simultaneously. In this case, the moving piece does not have to pose a threat by itself.  Instead, it makes the opponent "trip over their own feet" because capturing the offending piece will necessarily break one line of defense or the other.

In diagram B, White is at a  disadvantage, and apparently can't queen the a-pawn because the black bishop guards the queening square. However, 1.Nd5 interferes with the bishop and with the black rooks' defense of each other. If 1...Bxd5, 2.Rxd8 is crushing. If 1...R8xd5, then 2.Rh8 mate. The best Black can do is 1...R2xd5, interfering with the bishop's guard of a8 and permitting 2.a8=Q.

Although interferences are quite rare in actual play, they are a common theme in chess problems. The device in the last example above, in which a sacrifice occurs on the intersection of the defensive lines of two differently moving pieces, is known to problemists as a Novotny. Various other types of interference are given specific names in problem terminology, including the Grimshaw, Plachutta (where the two pieces both move orthogonally; see a beautiful example by Tarrasch), anti-Bristol, Holzhausen and Wurzburg–Plachutta.

See also

 Glossary of chess problems

References

Chess tactics